Hans Ulrich Fisch (1583–1647) was a Swiss painter.

External links

References
This article was initially translated from the German Wikipedia.

17th-century Swiss painters
Swiss male painters
1583 births
1647 deaths